In philately, label or coupon or tab is a part of sheet of stamps separated from them with perforation (or narrow white margin in imperforate stamps). It cannot be used for postage because it does not have face value and any indication of a postal administration that issued such stamps with labels. The notion of label should not be confused with the term "gutter" or with a margin of a stamp sheet.

Sometimes, label is also a stamp-like adhesive of no postal value, often used for promotional purposes.

See also 
 Adhesive label
 Gutter (philately)

References

Other websites 

 Label, AskPhil

Philatelic terminology